The 20481/20482 Bhagat Ki Kothi–Thiruchirappalli Humsafar Express is a Superfast Express train belonging to North Western Railway zone that runs between  and Tiruchirappalli Junction. It was announced to be operated with 14815/14816 train numbers on a weekly basis. Initially it was introduced as Tambaram–Bhagat Ki Kothi Humsafar AC Express. After July 21, 2021, it was upgraded as Superfast Express and it was extended to Tiruchirappalli Junction and will run as Bhagat Ki Kothi–Tiruchirappalli Junction Humsafar AC Superfast Express with new timings from Tiruchirappalli Junction to Bhagat Ki Kothi. And the timings between Bhagat Ki Kothi–Tambaram remains unchanged.

Coach composition 

The 14815/6 Bhagat Ki Kothi–Tiruchirappalli Junction–Bhagat Ki Kothi Humsafar Superfast Express has

 22 AC Three Tier coaches
 9 Sleeper class
 2 End-On Generator cars

History and service

During its initial days it ran as Bhagat Ki Kothi–Tambaram–Bhagat Ki Kothi Humsafar Express. 14815 departs Bhagat Ki Kothi at 15:20 on every Wednesday and reaches Tambaram at 10:45 on every Friday.

In the opposite direction 14816 leaves Tambaram at 19:15 on every Friday and reaches Bhagat Ki Kothi at 19:00 on every Sunday.

But after 21 July 2021 it was upgraded as a Superfast Express and was extended to Tiruchirappalli Junction and runs as Bhagat Ki Kothi–Tiruchirappalli Junction–Bhagat Ki Kothi Humsafar Superfast Express with same train number, but 14816 timings and days were changed since it was extended to Tiruchirappalli. So accordingly, 14815 Bhagat Ki Kothi–Tiruchirappalli Junction Humsafar Superfast Express is scheduled to leave Bhagat Ki Kothi at 16:10 on Wednesdays and reaches Tiruchirappalli Junction at 16:05 on Fridays. The 14816 Tiruchirappalli Junction–Bhagat Ki Kothi Humsafar Superfast Express leaves Tiruchirappalli Junction at 07:30 on Saturdays and reaches the Bhagat Ki Kothi at 07:45 on Mondays.

Route and halts 

 
 
 
 
 
 
 
 
 
 
 
 
 
 
 
 
 
 
 
 
 
 
Tiruchirappalli Junction

Traction
The same will be followed in its return journey.

Schedule

Direction reversals

See also 

 Humsafar Express

Notes

References

External links 

Humsafar Express trains
Transport in Chennai
Transport in Jodhpur
Rail transport in Rajasthan
Rail transport in Madhya Pradesh
Rail transport in Maharashtra
Rail transport in Telangana
Rail transport in Andhra Pradesh
Rail transport in Tamil Nadu
Railway services introduced in 2018